Elvis Leroy Reifer  (21 March 1961 – 26 August 2011) was a West Indian cricketer. He was a left-handed batsman and bowled left-arm fast-medium.

Reifer made his List A debut for Barbados in 1984. The same season he was signed by Hampshire County Cricket Club, despite having no first-class experience. In his first match for Hampshire he took eight wickets against Cambridge University. Despite this promising start his bowling average started to rise. After just one season with Hampshire he was released and went on to play only one more first-class game for Barbados, before being released at the end of the 1986 West Indian cricket season.

Reifer was the uncle of former West Indies captain Floyd Reifer and the father of Raymon Reifer.  He died in his sleep in Bridgetown, Barbados on 26 August 2011.

References

External links
Elvis Reifer at ESPNcricinfo
Elvis Reifer at CricketArchive

1961 births
2011 deaths
Barbadian cricketers
Barbados cricketers
Hampshire cricketers
People from Saint George, Barbados